Hanne Desmet (born 26 October 1996) is a Belgian short track speed skater.

Biography
Desmet was born in Wilrijk, lives in Mechelen, and is the older sister of short track speed skater Stijn Desmet. When Stijn was scouted by Pieter Gysel, Desmet started short track speed herself.

Desmet is a three-time Belgian all-round champion, and in 2018, she became this by winning all individual distances. Moreover, she holds the Belgian records for all distances. At the 2019 European Championships, she took second place in the unofficial 3000m distance.

Desmet took silver in the 1000 meters at the 2021 World Short Track Speed Skating Championships. On 11 February 2022, Desmet took a historic bronze medal in the Women's 1000 metres at the 2022 Winter Olympics in Beijing, becoming the first Belgian woman to win a medal at a Winter Olympic Games in an individual event.

References

External links
 

1996 births
Living people
People from Wilrijk
Belgian female short track speed skaters
World Short Track Speed Skating Championships medalists
Olympic short track speed skaters of Belgium
Short track speed skaters at the 2022 Winter Olympics
Medalists at the 2022 Winter Olympics
Olympic medalists in short track speed skating
Olympic bronze medalists for Belgium